Ri Hyok-chol is the name of:

Ri Hyok-chol (footballer, born 1973), North Korean footballer, played for the national team between 1999 and 2000
Ri Hyok-chol (footballer, born 1985), North Korean footballer, played for the national team between 2004 and 2007
Ri Hyok-chol (footballer, born 1991), North Korean footballer, played for the national team from 2014
Ri Hyok-chol (footballer, born 1992), North Korean footballer, played for the national youth team